Cesta (also Cesta pri Starem Logu) is a former settlement in the Municipality of Kočevje in southern Slovenia. The area is part of the traditional region of Lower Carniola and is now included in the Southeast Slovenia Statistical Region. Its territory is now part of the village of Pugled pri Starem Logu.

History
Cesta was a village inhabited by Gottschee Germans. Before the Second World War it had eight houses. In 1942 a "labor battalion" was stationed here in charge of working the fields, harvesting the crops, and mowing. The village was burned by Italian troops in July 1942 during the Rog Offensive and was never rebuilt.

References

External links
Cesta on Geopedia
Pre–World War II map of Cesta with oeconyms and family names

Former populated places in the Municipality of Kočevje